Iron:rusticyanin reductase (Cyc2) is an enzyme with systematic name Fe(II):rusticyanin oxidoreductase. This enzyme catalyses the following chemical reaction

 Fe(II) + rusticyanin  Fe(III) + reduced rusticyanin

Rusticyanin reductase contains c-type heme.

References

External links 
 

EC 1.16.9